The Millionaire Kid is a 1936 American drama film produced and released by Reliable Pictures with former silent stars Bryant Washburn and Betty Compson in the leads and with several other familiar silent personalities in supporting roles.

Cast
Betty Compson as Gloria Neville
Bryant Washburn as Terry Malone
Charles Delaney as Breezy Benson
Lois Wilde as Kitty Malone
Bradley Metcalfe as Tommy Neville
Creighton Hale as Thomas Neville
Eddie Phillips as Joe Toronto
Eddie Gribbon as Hogan
Al St. John as Matthews
Josef Swickard as The Tutor
 John Elliott as Yellerton
Earl Dwire as Black
Ed Cassidy as Red
Arthur Thalasso as Morley
Roger Williams as City Editor

References

External links
 The Millionaire Kid at IMDb.com
allmovie/synopsis; The Millionaire Kid

1936 films
1936 romantic drama films
Films directed by Bernard B. Ray
Reliable Pictures films
American romantic drama films
1930s English-language films
1930s American films